Palaeopisthacanthidae is an extinct family of scorpions.

See also 
 Taxonomy of scorpions

References

External links 
 
 

Prehistoric scorpions
Prehistoric arthropod families
†
Pennsylvanian first appearances
Pennsylvanian extinctions